Main Brook is a town in the Canadian province of Newfoundland and Labrador. The town had a population of 246 in the Canada 2021 Census.

Demographics 

Climate

References

See also
 List of cities and towns in Newfoundland and Labrador

Towns in Newfoundland and Labrador